High Caliber is an album by Vallejo, California rapper Jay Tee, from N2Deep/Latino Velvet.

Track listing 
"When I Come Thru"
"Everybody Love"
"Big Caddy"
"Boss to Preciseness" (featuring E-40 & Turf Talk)
"We Bubble" (featuring Baby Beesh)
"I Can't Go For That" (featuring Mac Dre & Miami)
"Shake the Spot"
"Born Ready" (featuring 10sion)
"Wants to Be"
"What We Do" (featuring Baby Beesh & Frost)
"Bounce Bounce" (featuring Don Cisco, B-12 & Miami)
"D.A.U. (skit)"
"Youngsta"
"Baby Girl" (featuring Gemini & MC Magic)

Sources
[ AllMusic link]
40 Ounce Records link

Jay Tee albums
2002 albums
Albums produced by Happy Perez